Sir Thomas Palmer, 4th Baronet, of Carlton (1702 – 14 June 1765) was a British politician.

He was the only surviving son of Robert Palmer of Medbourne, Leicestershire and educated at Emmanuel College, Cambridge. He succeeded his father in 1724, and his uncle, Sir Geoffery Palmer as the 4th Baronet in 1732. His family seat was East Carlton Hall in Northamptonshire.

He was a Member of Parliament (MP) for Leicestershire from 1754 to 1765, having been returned unopposed in 1761. He was appointed High Sheriff of Northamptonshire for 1740–41.

He married Jemima (d.1763), the second daughter of Sir John Harpur, 4th Baronet, in 1735; they had three sons and two daughters.

References

|-

1702 births
1765 deaths
Alumni of Emmanuel College, Cambridge
Baronets in the Baronetage of England
Members of the Parliament of Great Britain for Leicestershire
British MPs 1754–1761
British MPs 1761–1768
High Sheriffs of Northamptonshire